Below is a list of footballers who have played or currently playing for Kelantan FA.

List of players

Local players

Note
 – Ongoing

Foreign players

Notes
 - Ongoing

Key to positions

References

Kelantan FA
 
Kelantan FA
Association football player non-biographical articles